Edgar Chagwa Lungu (born 11 November 1956) is a Zambian politician who served as the sixth president of Zambia from 25 January 2015 to 24 August 2021. Under President Michael Sata, Lungu served as Minister of Justice and Minister of Defence. Following Sata's death in October 2014, Lungu was adopted as the candidate of the Patriotic Front in a Convention of the Patriotic Front in Kabwe, for the January 2015 presidential by-election, which was to determine who would serve out the remainder of Sata's term. In the election, he narrowly defeated opposition candidate Hakainde Hichilema and took office on 25 January 2015.

Lungu was elected to a full presidential term in the August 2016 election, again narrowly defeating Hichilema. Hichilema initially disputed the election result and filed a case at the Constitutional Court to nullify the result. On 5 September, however, the court dismissed the case. Lungu was sworn in for his first full term on 13 September 2016.

In 2021, Lungu was defeated by long-time opposition leader Hakainde Hichilema (his 2015 and 2016 opponent), after the Electoral Commission of Zambia declared the victory of Hichilema in that year's presidential election.

Early life and law career

Lungu was born 11 November 1956 at Ndola Central Hospital. After graduating with a LL.B. in 1981 from the University of Zambia, he joined the law firm Andrea Masiye and Company in Lusaka. He subsequently underwent military officer training at Miltez in Kabwe under Zambia National Service (ZNS). He then returned to practising law. He then joined politics.

In 2010, Edgar Lungu had his law practicing licence suspended by the Law Association of Zambia. This was after he was found guilty of professional misconduct.

Political career
After the PF won the 2011 election, Lungu became Junior Minister in the Vice-President's office. He was subsequently promoted to Minister of Home Affairs on 9 July 2012. He became Minister of Defence on 24 December 2013 after Geoffrey Bwalya Mwamba resigned from his ministerial post, and he functioned as Acting President during President Michael Sata's long-term illness in 2013–14. He has also held a string of central positions in his party, including Chair of the PF Central Committee on Discipline, and he became PF Secretary General and Minister of Justice on 28 August 2014 to replace Wynter Kabimba, who was fired. These positions were in addition to the Defence portfolio.	

Sata went abroad for medical treatment on 19 October 2014, leaving Lungu in charge of the country in his absence. Sata died on 28 October 2014. Vice-President Dr. Guy Scott took over as Acting President, and Lungu was viewed as one of the main contenders to ultimately succeed Sata in a presidential by-election.

On 3 November 2014, Acting President Dr. Guy Scott dismissed Lungu as Secretary-General of the PF. He replaced him with Davis Mwila, the Member of Parliament for Chipili. The next day, Scott reinstated Lungu. On 30 November, Lungu was elected as President of the Patriotic Front at a national convention of the party held in Kabwe, Zambia. However the convention was unusual because no voting took place. Instead, the unaccredited delegates elected him by raising hands.

On 20 January 2015, Lungu contested the presidential by-election and beat his closest rival Hakainde Hichilema of the United Party for National Development by a narrow majority of just 27,757 votes (1.66%), with just 32.36% of the registered electorate participating. He was declared the winner by the Electoral Commission of Zambia on 24 January.

Finishing Sata's term (2015–2016)
Lungu was sworn in as President of Zambia on 25 January 2015 at the National Heroes Stadium in the capital Lusaka.

The following month, Lungu forced the head of the central bank out of office and promised lower interest rates. He appointed Inonge Wina as Zambia's first female Vice-President.

In March 2015 Lungu collapsed while holding a speech commemorating International Women's Day in Lusaka. After spending a short while in a Zambian hospital he had an operation for his narrowed oesophagus in Pretoria, South Africa.

Lungu commuted the death sentences of 332 prisoners to life in prison on 16 July 2015 and condemned the massive overcrowding at the Mukobeko prison, calling it "an affront to basic human dignity".

In October 2015, Lungu ordered a national day of prayer in hopes of preventing further damage to the economy. Top religious and political officials participated, and other public events were cancelled.

First full term (2016–2021)

Lungu ran for a full term in the August 2016 presidential election, which turned out to be a rematch of the 2015 presidential election between Lungu and UPND candidate Hakainde Hichilema. Lungu won the election with 50.32% of the vote, just a few thousand votes over the threshold for avoiding a run-off.  He also increased his margin of victory over Hichilema to 100,530 votes or 2.72%. Hichilema refused to concede defeat after the announcement of official results and filed a petition before the Constitutional Court, asking for the results to be nullified due to irregularities. The court dismissed the case on 5 September 2016 and Lungu was inaugurated for a full five-year term of office on 13 September.

In December 2019, Lungu expressed anti-LGBT rhetoric, stating "Even animals don't do it, so why should we be forced to do it?... because we want to be seen to be smart, civilised and advanced and so on".

Personal life
Lungu married Esther Lungu in 1986 and has six children, including Tasila Lungu, the Member of Parliament (MP) for Chawama (elected in 2021). He and his family are practicing Catholics.

Books 
Against All Odds, a biography of Lungu by the Zambian journalist and senior diplomat Anthony Mukwita, was published by Partridge Africa on 5 January 2017.

The book set records when it became the first Zambian book to go on sale at Barnes & Noble and the first Zambian book on a head of state to be featured in the London Book Fair in Hammersmith.

See also
 List of international presidential trips made by Edgar Lungu

References

External links
 

 
1956 births
Living people
Defence Ministers of Zambia
Justice Ministers of Zambia
Patriotic Front (Zambia) politicians
People from Ndola
Presidents of Zambia
University of Zambia alumni
20th-century Zambian lawyers
Zambian Baptists
Members of the National Assembly of Zambia
Home Affairs ministers of Zambia
21st-century Zambian politicians